Prince Ato Bilson (born 1 June 2000) is a Ghanaian footballer who currently plays as a goalkeeper for Ghana Premier League side WAFA.

Career 
Bilson started his career with West African Football Academy in January 2018. On 6 May 2018, he made his debut in a 1–1 draw against Wa All Stars after he was brought on in the 90th minute to replace Richmond Ayi who had received a two yellow cards and was sent off with a red card.

Due to the red card to Ayi, he started the following match against Accra Hearts of Oak, which he kept a clean sheet. He returned to his back up role after Ayi served his suspension. He made the squad for the 2019–20 season however due to the introduction of Sabi Acquah Ferdinand, he served as back up goalkeeper until match day 7 against Great Olympics. After keeping a clean sheet in that match, he went on to start in 9 consecutive matches including keeping the post in WAFA's 6–1 victory over Ashanti Gold.

References

External links 

 

Living people
2000 births
Association football goalkeepers
Ghanaian footballers
West African Football Academy players
Ghana Premier League players